Barbodes polylepis is a species of cyprinid fish endemic to China.

References

Barbodes
Fish described in 1988